Philosophy of Love, Sex, and Marriage: An Introduction is a 2010 book by Raja Halwani, in which the author provides an introduction to philosophical aspects of sex, love, and marriage based on virtue ethics.

Reception
The book was reviewed by John Corvino, Jane O’Grady,
Stan van Hooft,
Ronald de Sousa, Christian Perring, John R. Williams, and Shaun D. Miller.

References

External links
 Philosophy of Love, Sex, and Marriage

Books about the philosophy of sexuality
2010 non-fiction books
Routledge books
Books about the philosophy of love
Books about marriage
Virtue ethics
English-language books